Children Without is a 1964 American short documentary film directed by Charles Guggenheim, about a young girl and her brother growing up in the housing projects of Detroit. It was nominated for an Academy Award for Best Documentary Short, losing to another film by Guggenheim, Nine from Little Rock. Children Without was preserved by the Academy Film Archive in 2016.

See also
List of American films of 1964

References

External links

1964 films
1964 documentary films
1964 short films
1960s English-language films
1960s short documentary films
Films directed by Charles Guggenheim
Documentary films about children
Films set in Detroit
American short documentary films
1960s American films